Konz is a Verbandsgemeinde ("collective municipality") in the district Trier-Saarburg, in Rhineland-Palatinate, Germany. The seat of the Verbandsgemeinde is in Konz.

The Verbandsgemeinde Konz consists of the following Ortsgemeinden ("local municipalities"):

Kanzem 
Konz
Nittel 
Oberbillig 
Onsdorf 
Pellingen 
Tawern 
Temmels 
Wasserliesch 
Wawern 
Wellen 
Wiltingen

Verbandsgemeinde in Rhineland-Palatinate